In religion and spirituality, a pilgrimage is a very long journey or search of great moral significance.  Sometimes, it is a journey to a sacred area or shrine of importance to innate
faith. Members of every major religion participate in pilgrimages.  A person who makes such a journey is called a pilgrim.

Unlike some other religions, Hindus are not required to undertake pilgrimages during their lifetime. However, most Hindus go on such journeys to numerous iconic sites including those below:

India

Char Dham (Famous Four Pilgrimage sites): The four holy sites Puri, Rameswaram, Dwarka, and Badrinath (or alternatively the Himalayan towns of Badrinath, Kedarnath, Gangotri, and Yamunotri) compose the Chota Char Dham (four small abodes) pilgrimage circuit.

Kumbh Mela: The Kumbh Mela (the "pitcher festival") is one of the holiest of Hindu pilgrimages that is held every three years; the location is rotated among Prayagraj, Haridwar, Nashik, and Ujjain.

Old Holy cities as per Puranic Texts: Varanasi formerly known as Kashi, Prayagraj also known as Prayag, Haridwar-Rishikesh, Mathura-Vrindavan, Kurukshetra, the Land of Bhagavad Gita in Haryana and Ayodhya.

Old Temple cities: Puri, which hosts a major Vaishnava Jagannath temple and Rath Yatra celebration; Katra, home to the Vaishno Devi temple; Tirumala - Tirupati, home to the Tirumala Venkateswara Temple; Madurai Meenakshi and Sri Ranganathaswamy Temple in Sri Rangam; Dwarkadhish Temple - Dwarka, home to Dwarkadhish form of Sri Krishna; Radharani Temple - Barsana, dedicated to Sri Radha, Sabarimala, where Swami Ayyappan is worshipped; Sri Padmanabhaswamy Temple at Thiruvananthapuram, Kerala;Guruvayur temple at Guruvayur. The oldest of these temple pilgrimages is the Pandharpur Wari which is said to be in tradition from the past 800 years.

New Pilgrimage Centres: Three comparatively recent temples of fame and huge pilgrimage are Belur Math, the hub of the worldwide Ramakrishna Movement in West Bengal, Dakshineswar Kali Temple, Kolkata; Vivekananda Rock Memorial at Kanyakumari; Sri Ramana Ashram at Tiruvannamalai; and ISKCON temples in Ujjain, Bangalore, Patna, Tirumala, Vishakapatnam, Delhi, Chennai, and Mumbai. Ramakrishna Mission Swami Vivekananda's Ancestral House and Cultural Centre, the birthplace of Swami Vivekananda is also another popular destination.

Shakti Pitha: An important set of pilgrimages are the Shakti Pitha, where the Mother Goddess is worshipped, the two principal ones being Kalighat and Kamakhya. The original Shakti Pitha are
 Mahamaya, Amarnath, Jammu, and Kashmir
 Phullara, in Attahasa, West Bengal
 Shri Shakambhari Devi, Saharanpur, Uttar Pradesh
 Bahula, Bardhaman, West Bengal
 Mahishmardini, Bakreshwar, Siuri town
 Avanti, Bairavparvat Ujjain, Madhya Pradesh
 Aparna, Bhavanipur, Bangladesh
 Gandaki Chandi, Chandi River
 Bhamari, Janasthaan
 Kottari, Hinglaj, Karachi
 Jayanti, Bourbhag Village, Bangladesh
 Yogeshwari, Khulna district
 Jwala or Shakti Siddhida, Kangra, Himachal Pradesh
 Kalika, Kalighat, West Bengal
 Kali in Kalmadhav, Amarkantak, Madhya Pradesh
 Khamakya, Guwahati, Assam
 Devgarbha/Kankleshwari, Birbhum, West Bengal
 Sravani, Kanyakumari, Tamil Nadu
 Chamudeshwari/Jaya Durga, Chamundi Hills, Mysore
 Vimla, Murshidabad, West Bengal
 Kumara Shakti at Anandamayee Temple of West Bengal
 Shakti Bhraamari, Ratnavali, West Bengal
 Shakti Dakshayani, Manasarovar
 Gayatri Manibandh, Pushkar, Rajasthan
 Uma at Mithila, border of Nepal and India
 Indraksh, Nainativu, Manipallavam
 Mahashira, Guhyeshwari near Pashupatinath Temple
 Bhawani at Chandranath Hills, Bangladesh
 Varahi, Panch Sagar, Uttar Pradesh
 Chandrabhaga, Junagarh, Gujarat
 Lalita of Prayag
 Savitri/Bhadra Kali, Kurukshetra, Haryana
 Maihar/Shivani, Satna, Madhya Pradesh
 Nandini or Nandikeshwari, Birbhum, West Bengal
 Sarvashail/Rakini on Godavari river banks at Kotilingeswar Temple
 Mahish Mardini at Shivaharkaray near Karachi of Pakistan
 The Narmada Shondesh, Amarkantak, Madhya Pradesh
 Sundari at Sri Sailam (currently in Bangladesh)
 Maha Lakshmi at Sri Shail (currently in Bangladesh)
 Devi Narayani, Suchindram, Tamil Nadu
 Suganda of Shikarpur (currently in Bangladesh)
 Tripura Sundari, Udaipur in Tripura
 Mangal Chandika at Ujjain
 Vishalakshi, Varanasi, Uttar Pradesh
 Kapalini of Vibash, Medinipur, West Bengal
 Ambika, Bharatpur, Rajasthan
 Uma at Vrindavan/Bhooteswar Temple of Uttar Pradesh
 Tripurmalini, Jalandhar, Punjab
 Amba at Ambaji, Gujarat
 Jai Durga, Deogarh, Jharkhand
 Danteshwari, Chhattisgarh
 Nabi Gaya, Biraj, Jaipur. According to later texts, there are altogether 51 or 108 shakti peethas, though many in the lists cannot be confirmed to exist and may have been added in order to list a religiously significant number.

Jyotirlingas: Other set of important pilgrimages are the Jyotirlingas, where lord Shiva is worshipped in the form of Shiva Lingas. There are twelve Jyotirlingas in India. The twelve Jyotirlingas are:
 Bhimashankar Temple, near Pune
 Somnath at Veraval in Gujarat
 Mallikarjuna Jyotirlinga at Srisailam in Andhra Pradesh
 Mahakaleshwar Jyotirlinga at Ujjain in Madhya Pradesh
 Omkareshwar in Madhya Pradesh
 Kedarnath in Uttarakhand
 Vishwanath Temple at Varanasi in Uttar Pradesh
 Trimbakeshwar Shiva Temple at Nashik in Maharashtra
 Vaidyanath Jyotirlinga 
 Aundha Nagnath in Hingoli, Maharashtra or Nageshvara Jyotirlinga at Dwarka
 Rameshwar at Rameshwaram in Tamil Nadu
 Grishneshwar at Verul near Ellora Aurangabad

Sri Lanka
 Pancha Ishwarams - the 5 ancient Shiva temples of the island from classical antiquity.
 The Arunagirinathar-traversed ancient Murugan pilgrimage route of Sri Lanka including
 Maviddapuram Kandaswamy Temple, Maviddapuram, Kankesanthurai
 Nallur Kandaswamy temple, Jaffna,
 Koneswaram temple, Trincomalee,
 Verugal Murugan Kovil, Verugal Aru, Verugal, Trincomalee District
 Thirukkovil Sithira Velayutha Swami Kovil, in Thirukkovil, Batticaloa,
 Arugam Bay, Amparai
 Panamai, Amparai
 Ukanthamalai Murugan Kovil, in Okanda, Kumana National Park
 Kataragama temple, Katirkamam in the South.

Mauritius
 Ganga Talao
Sagar Shiv Mandir

Trinidad and Tobago
Temple in the Sea, Waterloo Road, Waterloo, Carapichaima, Couva–Tabaquite–Talparo, Trinidad and Tobago
Dattatreya Mandir and 85-foot Karyasiddhi Hanuman Murti, Datta Drive, Orangefield, Carapichaima, Couva–Tabaquite–Talparo, Trinidad and Tobago
Shiva Lingam Mandir, Patiram Trace, Penal, Penal-Debe, Trinidad and Tobago
 Ganga Dhara festival at the Trinnaadeeshwar Mahadeo Ghat, Kailash Ghat, Hanuman Ghat, Tulsidas Ghat, Ardha Naareshvar Ghat, and Mundan Sanskaar Ghat at Marianne River Blanchisseuse, Tunapuna-Piarco, Trinidad and Tobago
Siapria Mai (La Divina Pastora) Church, La Pastora Street, Siparia, Siparia region, Trinidad and Tobago
Exchange Village Shiv Mandir, Brickfield Road Exchange Village, Couva, Couva–Tabaquite–Talparo, Trinidad and Tobago
Moose Bhagat Mandir, Naparima Mayaro Road Mairad Village, Tableland, Princes Town, Trinidad and Tobago
Shiva Mandir, 1 Railway Road Reform Village, Gasparillo, Princes Town, Trinidad and Tobago
Balka Devi Mandir (Mud Volcano Temple), St. Marie Road, Cedros, Siparia, Trinidad and Tobago
Shree Pavan Putra Hanuman Shiv Shakti Mandir Cunjal Road, Cunjal, Princes Town, Trinidad and Tobago
Triveni Mandir, Sisters Road, Hardbargain Village, Williamsville, Princes Town, Trinidad and Tobago

Suriname
Arya Diwaker Mandir

Pakistan

 Hinglaj Mata - A Shakthi Peeth in Pakistan's Balochistan province
 Katasraj temple - Site of a famous temple which has a lake that is said to have been created from the teardrops of Shiva. Also known for being home of the Pandava brothers during part of their exile.
 Sharada Peeth -An abandoned Shakti Peeth
 Shrine of Lal Shahbaz Qalandar - Sufi shrine that is important to Sindhi Hindus
 Tilla Jogian - ancient shrine reportedly over 2,000 years old.
 Shakti Peetha
 Chandragup
 Panj Tirath
 Amb Temples
 Umarkot Shiv Mandir
 Churrio Jabal Durga Mata Temple
 Kalat Kali Temple
 Goraknath Temple
 Kalibari Mandir, Peshawar

Nepal

 Barahachhetra
 Janakpurdham
 Muktinath
 Pashupatinath Temple
 Changu Narayan Temple
 Buddhanilkantha
 Krishna Temple of Patan Durbar Square
 Rishikesh Complex of Ruru Kshetra
 Vyas cave
 Doleshwor Mahadev (considered the head part of Kedarnath temple of India)
 Dolakha Bhimsen temple
 Pathibhara Devi temple
 Halesi Mahadev Temple and Halesi-Maratika Caves

China

 Mount Kailash
 Lake Manasarovar

Indonesia
 Mother Temple of Besakih
 Prambanan
 Mount Bromo

Cambodia

 Preah Vihear Temple
 Angkor Wat

Malaysia

 Batu Caves
 Arulmigu Balathandayuthapani Temple, Penang

United States

 Vivekananda Cottage, Thousand Island Park, Jefferson County, New York

See also

 Hindu pilgrimage sites in India
 List of Hindu temples

References

https://www.iskconbangalore.org/

 
Hinduism-related lists
Lists of pilgrimage sites